Crowborough railway station is on the  branch of the Oxted Line in England, serving the town of Crowborough, East Sussex.

The station and all trains that call are operated by Southern.

History
The station was opened by the Brighton, Uckfield and Tunbridge Wells Railway on 3 August 1868 and was originally named Rotherfield. It was renamed several times: to Crowborough on 1 August 1880; to Crowborough & Jarvis Brook on 1 May 1897; before resuming the name Crowborough from 12 May 1980.

The station was also used to transport goods from the nearby brickyard and the old platform still remains but is disused. The old track still exists around the goods yard, however, like the platform, these are overgrown and disused. The signal box was sited at the south end of the down platform but was closed in January 1990 when the line was resignalled.

In early 2016, both platforms were extended to allow ten-coach trains to stop.

Facilities and Connections
The station has a ticket office which is staffed during Monday-Saturday mornings. At other times, the station is unstaffed and tickets can be purchased from the self-service ticket machine at the station.

The station has passenger help points and covered seating areas available on both platforms. There are also toilets at the station. The station has a pay and display car park and taxi-rank at its main entrance. There is also a cycle rack on the London bound platform.

The London bound platform is accessible without steps although the Uckfield bound platform is only reachable by the stepped footbridge so isn't accessible. However work starting in October 2021 will remedy this with the installation of a new footbridge featuring lifts

The station is served Monday-Saturday by the Compass Travel routes 228/229 bus routes to Tunbridge Wells. The Brighton and Hove Regency route 29 to Brighton and Lewes also stops nearby in Crowborough Town Centre.

Services 
All services at Crowborough are operated by Southern using  DMUs.

The typical off-peak service in trains per hour is:
 1 tph to  via 
 1 tph to 
 
Services increase to 2 tph in each direction during the peak hours. 

On Sundays, the northbound service runs as far as Oxted only.

References

External links 

Railway stations in East Sussex
Former London, Brighton and South Coast Railway stations
Railway stations in Great Britain opened in 1868
Railway stations served by Govia Thameslink Railway
Crowborough